Koo Kam (Thai: คู่กรรม) is a Thai novel written by Thommayanti. It was adapted into a 1996 film, Sunset at Chaopraya, and a 2013 remake that shared the same name.

Plot summary

Set in 1939, the early days of World War II in Thailand, the novel opens with Angsumalin meeting one last time with her childhood friend, a young Thai man named Vanus. He is leaving for England for his studies and hopes that Angsumalin will wait for him and marry him when he returns.
 
Shortly thereafter, Thailand is invaded by Japanese military forces. In Thonburi, opposite Bangkok on the Chaophraya River, the Imperial Japanese Navy establishes itself at a base. The forces there are led by Kobori, an idealistic young navy lieutenant. One day he sees Angsumalin swimming in the river and falls for her. She, being a proudly nationalistic Thai woman, despises him because he is a foreigner.
 
Nonetheless, Kobori persists at seeing her and a courtship develops. Angsumalin found that Kobori is a real nice gentleman and start falling for him but she kept her feelings in secret because of the war.
 
Then, for political reasons, Angsumalin's father – who is a leader in the Free Thai Movement, insists that she marry Kobori. Understanding that Angsumalin is not marrying him out of love, Kobori promises not to touch her, but he breaks that vow after the wedding.
 
Despite this, Angsumalin develops tender feelings for Kobori, but is still torn by her feelings for her nation and feel guilty to Vanus, who returns to set in motion a conflict between the two men.

Film, TV or theatrical adaptations
 Koo Gum (1973) – Starring Nard Poowanai as Kobori 
 Koo Gum (1988) – Starring Waruth Woratum as Kobori and Chintara Sukapatana as Angsumalin (Hideko) – is the author's favourite version of Koo Gum, the review mentioned this is the best version of Koo Gum that have ever been made
 Koo Gum (1990) – 26 episode TV series on Channel 7 starring Kwang Komoltithi as Angsumalin and Thongchai McIntyre as Kobori, regarded as the most successful TV series in the Thai entertainment industry history, because it received a high rating of 40, which is the highest record to date.
 Sunset at Chaopraya (1996) – Starring Thongchai McIntyre as Kobori and Apasiri Nitibhon as Angsumalin
 Koo Gum - The Musical (2003) – Starring Ozeki Seigi as Kobori and Teeranai Na Nongkai as Angsumalin. Seigi was the only Japanese actor who played Kobori.
 Koo Gum (2004) – 12 episode TV series on Channel 3 starring Benz Pornchita as Angsumalin and Num Sornram as Kobori
 Koo Gum 2 (2004) – A sequel showing the journey of Kobori and Angsumalin's son 
 Sunset at Chaophraya (2013) – 24 episode TV series on Channel 5 Starring Sukrit Wisetkaew (Bie the Star) as Kobori and Noona Nuengtida as Angsumalin
 Sunset at Chaopraya (2013) – Starring Nadech Kugimiya as Kobori and Oranate D.Caballes as Angsumalin

References

External links 
 Koo Gum (1988) 
 Sunset at Chaophraya (2013) 
 Koo Gum (2013)
Novels by Thommayanti
Novels set in Thailand
Novels set in the 1930s
History of Thailand in fiction
Thai romance novels
Novels set during World War II
Historical romance novels